Four Creeks State Forest is a 13,147-acre protected area in Nassau County, Florida that includes the 13,060-acre Four Creeks State Forest and Wildlife Management Area . The site is located between Callahan and Yulee, Florida along the Duval/Nassau County line.

The area is named for the four creeks that traverse the property: Alligator (Mills), Thomas, Boggy and Plummer Creeks, which join to form the headwaters of the Nassau River.

See also
List of Florida state forests

References

External links
 Four Creeks State Forest - official site

Florida state forests
Protected areas of Nassau County, Florida